Henry VI is a series of three history plays by William Shakespeare, set during the lifetime of King Henry VI of England. Henry VI, Part 1 deals with the loss of England's French territories and the political machinations leading up to the Wars of the Roses, as the English political system is torn apart by personal squabbles and petty jealousy; Henry VI, Part 2 depicts the King's inability to quell the bickering of his nobles, and the inevitability of armed conflict; and Henry VI, Part 3 deals with the horrors of that conflict.

In 2016, scholars working on the New Oxford Shakespeare editions, announced that they were crediting Shakespeare's colleague and some time rival, Christopher Marlowe, as the co-author of the trilogy. It had long been suspected that the plays had co-authors. The Oxford scholars drew their conclusions by using "big data" techniques, using computer software to identify signature language patterns for an author (using a discipline known as stylometrics), and then checking the texts against those signatures.

Although the Henry VI trilogy may not have been written in chronological order, the three plays are often grouped together with Richard III to form a tetralogy, the "minor tetralogy", covering the entire Wars of the Roses saga, from the death of Henry V in 1422 to the rise to power of Henry VII in 1485. It was the success of this sequence of plays which firmly established Shakespeare's reputation as a playwright. The "major tetralogy" or Henriad, covering the previous reigns, were written later.

The three plays were published separately, and have often been performed separately, although they have also been combined in various adaptions into a single play or two plays.  Further details about performances and adaptations appear in the articles about the individual plays.

References

Shakespearean histories
Henry VI of England
Wars of the Roses in fiction